Jeffrey Scott Martin ( Brill; born October 2, 1969) is a Canadian guitarist and singer, best known for fronting the rock band The Tea Party. He began his career as a solo artist in 2005, when The Tea Party went on hiatus.

Biography

Early years
Martin began playing guitar as a child and in his adolescence played in bands The Shadows, Modern Movement, and The Stickmen. In 1988, Jeff graduated from Sandwich Secondary School along with future Tea Party bandmates Jeff Burrows and Stuart Chatwood. He went on to study music at the University of Windsor before leaving his studies prematurely due to philosophical differences with his music professor.

Martin has perfect pitch, as highlighted on "The Science of a Rock Concert", an episode of Daily Planet on Discovery Channel Canada. He also has synesthesia, as heard during an Alternate Tunings Guitar Workshop for Maton Guitars.

Professional career

The Tea Party (1990–2005, 2011–present) 
Forming The Tea Party in 1990 after a marathon jam session at the Cherry Beach Rehearsal Studios in Toronto, Martin produced all of The Tea Party's albums, including their debut album in 1991, distributing it through the band's own label, Eternal Discs. In 1993 The Tea Party signed to EMI Music Canada and released their first major-label recording entitled Splendor Solis. Martin employed open tunings to imitate Indian instruments such as the sitar, something he has continued to employ throughout his career. Further developing The Tea Party's sound in 1995, The Edges of Twilight was recorded with an array of Indian and Middle-eastern instrumentation while Martin drew lyrical inspiration from occult themes and pagan influenced literature.

Upon returning from tours in Canada, Europe and Australia in 1996, The Tea Party went on to record Alhambra, an Enhanced CD which features acoustic re-recordings of songs from The Edges of Twilight, followed by a brief tour around Canada known as "Alhambra acoustic and eclectic".

Transmission, filled with dark and angry music, was released in 1997; it included Martin's first foray into electronica. Triptych followed in 1999; the first single "Heaven Coming Down" rose to #1 on Canadian radio. Lyrically, Martin was less enigmatic than he was on previous albums:  on Triptych he wrote about the experiences of his years in the band.

In 1999, Martin performed as part of The White Ribbon Concert at the Phoenix Concert Theatre in Toronto. After releasing Tangents, a singles compilation, in 2000 and Illuminations, a DVD compilation of music videos which Martin remixed in Surround sound, The Tea Party released The Interzone Mantras in 2001 and Seven Circles in 2004. In October 2005, The Tea Party disbanded due to creative differences.

The band members regrouped in 2011 for a series of shows in their native Canada. The success of these dates led to The Tea Party reforming.

Solo career (2005–2008) 

Martin's debut solo album titled Exile and the Kingdom was released in Canada and Australia in 2006. Among those who worked with Martin were Michael Lee and Ritesh Das (Toronto Tabla Ensemble). The first single, titled "The World is Calling", is an open letter to the Bush administration. During this time Martin was supposed to collaborate with Scott Stapp but it did not ensue. In November 2006, Martin released a live album recorded that September, titled Live in Brisbane 2006. The two-disc album features Ritesh Das and the Toronto Tabla Ensemble, and consists of both solo and Tea Party songs. The album is a complete recording of a live performance full of Jeff's banter with bandmates and the audience, including his thoughts on the disbanding of The Tea Party and where he sees himself in life. In May 2007, Martin released his second live album Live in Dublin recorded with drummer Wayne P. Sheehy, while Martin's first solo music DVD Live at the Enmore Theatre was released through Shock DVD in July 2007.

The Armada (2008–2010) 
In early 2008 Martin (lead vocals, guitars) and Sheehy (drums) formed The Armada. The band's debut album, which features a similar sound to the Tea Party, was released on November 4, 2008.

Jeff Martin 777 (2010–present) 
In 2010, Martin began work on new music with Jay Cortez and Malcolm Clark (formerly of The Sleepy Jackson) for a new album to be entitled "The Ground Cries Out" under the new band name of Jeff Martin 777. On January 10, 2011, the title track from the album was released on Martin's Myspace page. The Ground Cries Out was released in Canada on March 1, 2011, and has subsequently been released in Australia. Following a Jeff Martin 777 Canadian tour, the band toured Australia from May 2011. During the tour Martin announced a reunion of The Tea Party for some Canadian shows in July and August. Following the success of those shows, The Tea Party announced the reunion was permanent.

As a record producer 
Martin was nominated as producer of the year at the 2000 Juno awards.
Martin has produced albums for Hundred Mile House's EP, The Jay Murphy Band's Propaganda, The Eternal's 'Under a New Sun' and Tenth Planet's The Prophet Curse EP. He also played upon Roy Harper's The Green Man. Martin recently produced the new album for Australian dark rock band The Eternal called 'Under A New Sun'. The album features a duet with singer Mark Kelson on the track 'The Sleeper'. Martin worked with emerging Australian band Lepers and Crooks to produce their debut album in 2016.

Martin's most recent work as a producer was with Australian indie-folk / rock duo Secret Solis. Jeff produced their debut EP, 'Deep Down' at River House Studios lending the band his instrumentation and voice as well. Martin plays all the heavy guitars, Hurdy Gurdy and synths including his Theremin.

Equipment

Guitars 
1916 Gibson Harp guitar
1964 Gibson J-50 acoustic
Gibson 12-string
Three Les Paul Classic 1960 reissues
Gibson 1971 Les Paul Recording 
Gibson EDS-1275
Gibson Explorer
1971 Fender Telecaster Parsons White B-Bender
Fender Stratocaster XII twelve string guitar
Rickenbacker 360/12 JetGlo
Danelectro
Ellis Guitars 7 string resonator guitar
Maton 12 string electro-acoustic guitar

Effects 
Dunlop Cry Baby
Early 1970s Memory Man analog delay unit
Reissue Small Stone
Early 1960s Echoplex
Matchless line switcher (with valves)
DigiTech 2112 Effects processor unit
TC Electronic G-Natural
TC-Helicon VoiceWorksPlus

Amps 
Two Fender 100 watt combo
Four Matchless Superchief 120 watt
No Name 1960's Tube 25 watt
Chute CC-04
Urei 1176 leveling amp
Teletronix LA-2A

Discography

Studio albums

Live albums

Video albums

Extended plays

See also
 The Armada
 The Tea Party

References

External links
Jeff Martin official website
Martin's Ellis seven-string resonator guitar at the Ellis Guitars website

1969 births
Living people
Canadian expatriates in Australia
Canadian male guitarists
Canadian male singers
Canadian record producers
Canadian rock guitarists
Canadian rock singers
Canadian songwriters
Musicians from Windsor, Ontario
Sarod players
The Tea Party members
Autoharp players